Parliamentary elections were held in Bulgaria on 18 November 1945, the country's first to feature universal suffrage for women. The Bulgarian Agrarian National Union and the Bulgarian Communist Party both won 94 seats. Voter turnout was 84.8%.

Results
For the first time, women could stand as candidates, with Stoyanka Ancheva, Ekaterina Avramova, Tsola Dragoycheva, Stanka Ivanova, Tsvetana Keranova, Elena Ketskarova, Mara Kinkel, Venera Klincharova, Vyara Makedonska, Stefana Markova, Ekaterina Nikolova, Rada Todorova, Mata Tyurkedzhieva, Maria Toteva and Vera Zlatareva becoming the first women in the National Assembly.

References

Bulgaria
Parliamentary elections in Bulgaria
Parliamentary
Bulgaria